The following list in mathematics contains the finite groups of small order up to group isomorphism.

Counts 
For n = 1, 2, … the number of nonisomorphic groups of order n is
 1, 1, 1, 2, 1, 2, 1, 5, 2, 2, 1, 5, 1, 2, 1, 14, 1, 5, 1, 5, ... 
For labeled groups, see .

Glossary 
Each group is named by Small Groups library as Goi, where o is the order of the group, and i is the  index of the group within that order.

Common group names:
 Zn: the cyclic group of order n (the notation Cn is also used; it is isomorphic to the additive group of Z/nZ)
 Dihn: the dihedral group of order 2n (often the notation Dn or D2n is used)
 D2n: the dihedral group of order 2n, the same as Dihn (notation used in section List of small non-abelian groups)
 Sn: the symmetric group of degree n, containing the n! permutations of n elements
 Dicn or Q4n: the dicyclic group of order 4n
 Q8: the quaternion group of order 8, also Dic2

The notations Zn and Dihn have the advantage that point groups in three dimensions Cn and Dn do not have the same notation. There are more isometry groups than these two, of the same abstract group type.

The notation  denotes the direct product of the two groups; Gn denotes the direct product of a group with itself n times. G ⋊ H denotes a semidirect product where H acts on G; this may also depend on the choice of action of H on G.

Abelian and simple groups are noted. (For groups of order , the simple groups are precisely the cyclic groups Zn, for prime n.) The equality sign ("=") denotes isomorphism.

The identity element in the cycle graphs is represented by the black circle.  The lowest order for which the cycle graph does not uniquely represent a group is order 16.

In the lists of subgroups, the trivial group and the group itself are not listed.  Where there are several isomorphic subgroups, the number of such subgroups is indicated in parentheses.

Angle brackets <relations> show the presentation of a group.

List of small abelian groups 
The finite abelian groups are either cyclic groups, or direct products thereof; see Abelian group. The numbers of nonisomorphic abelian groups of orders n = 1, 2, ... are
 1, 1, 1, 2, 1, 1, 1, 3, 2, 1, 1, 2, 1, 1, 1, 5, 1, 2, 1, 2, ... 
For labeled abelian groups, see .

List of small non-abelian groups
However, many orders have no non-abelian groups. The orders for which a non-abelian group exists are
 6, 8, 10, 12, 14, 16, 18, 20, 21, 22, 24, 26, 27, 28, 30, 32, 34, 36, 38, 39, 40, 42, 44, 46, 48, 50, ...

Classifying groups of small order

Small groups of prime power order pn are given as follows:
Order p: The only group is cyclic.
Order p2: There are just two groups, both abelian.
Order p3: There are three abelian groups, and two non-abelian groups. One of the non-abelian groups is the semidirect product of a normal cyclic subgroup of order p2 by a cyclic group of order p.
Order p4: The classification is complicated, and gets much harder as the exponent of p increases.

Most groups of small order have a Sylow p subgroup P with a normal p-complement N for some prime p dividing the order, so can be classified in terms of the possible primes p, p-groups P, groups N, and actions of P on N. In some sense this reduces the classification of these groups to the classification of p-groups. Some of the small groups that do not have a normal p-complement include:
Order 24: The symmetric group S4
Order 48: The binary octahedral group and the product 
Order 60: The alternating group A5.

The smallest order for which it is not known how many nonisomorphic groups there are is 2048 = 211.

Small Groups Library
The GAP computer algebra system contains a package called the "Small Groups library," which provides access to descriptions of small order groups. The groups are listed up to isomorphism. At present, the library contains the following groups:
 those of order at most 2000 except for order 1024 ( groups in the library; the ones of order 1024 had to be skipped, as there are an additional  nonisomorphic 2-groups of order 1024);
 those of cubefree order at most 50000 (395 703 groups);
 those of squarefree order;
 those of order pn for n at most 6 and p prime;
 those of order p7 for p = 3, 5, 7, 11 (907 489 groups);
 those of order pqn where qn divides 28, 36, 55 or 74 and p is an arbitrary prime which differs from q;
 those whose orders factorise into at most 3 primes (not necessarily distinct).

It contains explicit descriptions of the available groups in computer readable format.

The smallest order for which the Small Groups library does not have information is 1024.

See also
Classification of finite simple groups
Composition series
List of finite simple groups
Number of groups of a given order
Small Latin squares and quasigroups
Sylow theorems

Notes

References

, Table 1, Nonabelian groups order<32.
  A catalog of the 340 groups of order dividing 64 with tables of defining relations, constants, and lattice of subgroups of each group.

External links
 Particular groups in the Group Properties Wiki
 
 GroupNames database
 Hall, Jr., Marshall; Senior, James Kuhn (1964).  The Groups of Order 2n (n ≤ 6). New York: Macmillan / London: Collier-Macmillan Ltd. LCCN 64016861

Groups that are small
Groups that are small
Finite groups